Hypericeae is a tribe of the Hypericaceae family that contains the genera Hypericum, Thornea, and Lianthus. It was first described by Jacques Choisy, a Swiss botanist, in 1821 in the 32nd issue of Prodr. Monogr. Hypėric. It was also later described by Adolf Engler in 1895 in the Prantl, Nat. Pflanzenfam.

Description 
The tribe contains herbs and shrubs, with several common characteristics. Their ovaries all have 3-5 lateral membrane placenta, and are either incomplete or with 3-5 locules. Their seeds lack wings, and their cotyledons are normally shorter than their hypocotyls.

References

 
Malpighiales tribes